Jason Barnes (born December 27, 1979) is an American politician who served in the Missouri House of Representatives from 2011 to 2019.

References

1979 births
Living people
Republican Party members of the Missouri House of Representatives